Jose Ferial Harris, FBA, FRHistS (née Chambers; born 1941) is a historian and retired academic. She was Professor of Modern History at the University of Oxford from 1996 to 2008, and a fellow and tutor at St Catherine's College, Oxford, from 1978 to 1997.

Biography

Education 
Born Jose Ferial Chambers in 1941 at Bedford, she attended the Dame Alice Harpur School in Bedford before going up to Newnham College, Cambridge in 1959. She placed in the first class of both parts of the Historical Tripos, graduating in 1962 with a Bachelor of Arts degree (proceeding by convention to Master of Arts in 1966). She won the Helen Gladstone Scholarship (1962), Dr Ethel Williams Prize (1962) and the Gamble Studentship (1963) and went on to complete a doctorate at Cambridge; her PhD was awarded in 1970.

Career and honours 
Between 1964 and 1966 Chambers was a lecturer in history at University College London. She was elected to a research fellowship at Nuffield College, Oxford, in 1966. In 1968, she married the legal scholar James William Harris (1940–2004) and took his surname. The following year, she left Oxford and was appointed to a lectureship at the London School of Economics. Promotion to senior lecturer followed in 1974. In 1978, she was elected to a fellowship at St Catherine's College, Oxford, where she was also a college tutor. She was appointed Reader in Modern History at the University of Oxford in 1990, and was promoted to Professor of Modern History in 1996. She ceased to be a tutorial fellow at St Catherine's in 1997. She retired from her professorship in 2008 and was made an emeritus professor at the university; she is also an emeritus fellow at St Catherine's (where she had been the vice-master from 2003 to 2005).

Harris was elected a fellow of the British Academy in 1993. As of 2021, she is also a fellow of the Royal Historical Society. She gave the Ford Lectures at the University of Oxford in 1996–1997 on "A Land of Lost Content? Visions of Civic Virtue from Ruskin to Rawls".

Bibliography 
Books

Peer reviewed articles and chapters

Encyclopedia articles

References 

1941 births
Living people
English historians
Alumni of Newnham College, Cambridge
Academics of University College London
Fellows of Nuffield College, Oxford
Academics of the London School of Economics
Fellows of St Catherine's College, Oxford
Academics of the University of Oxford
Fellows of the British Academy